Solomin or Solomina (feminine) is a common Russian surname. Notable people with the surname include:

 Anatoliy Solomin (born 1952), Soviet and Ukrainian race walker
 Nikolay Solomin (1834–1882), Russian icon painter
 Pavel Solomin (born 1982), Uzbekistani footballer
 Pyotr Solomin (1839–1871), Russian poet and educationist
 Vassily Solomin (1953–1997), Soviet and Russian boxer
 Vitaly Solomin (1941–2002), Soviet and Russian actor, brother of Yury Solomin
 Yury Solomin (born 1935), Soviet and Russian actor, brother of Vitaly Solomin

See also
 10054 Solomin, main-belt asteroid named after Yuri Solomin

Russian-language surnames